John Braddock Clontz (born April 25, 1971) is an American former Major League Baseball (MLB) relief pitcher who played for the Atlanta Braves, Los Angeles Dodgers, New York Mets, and Pittsburgh Pirates between  and .

Amateur career
Clontz was born in Stuart, Virginia. He played college baseball at Virginia Tech and his contributions there earned him a spot in the Virginia Tech Sports Hall of Fame. In 1991, he played collegiate summer baseball with the Wareham Gatemen of the Cape Cod Baseball League, and received the league's Outstanding Relief Pitcher award.

Professional career
Clontz made his major league debut on April 26, 1995. During his career, he pitched for the Atlanta Braves, Los Angeles Dodgers, New York Mets, and Pittsburgh Pirates. 

Clontz was a member of the 1995 Atlanta Braves World Series Championship team. He was known for his distinctive sidearm/submarine windup and delivery. He last played for the Triple-A affiliate of the Florida Marlins, the Albuquerque Isotopes, in 2006.

Personal
. Every year he visits his former high school, Patrick County High School, in Stuart, Virginia, to donate cleats, baseballs, and jerseys for their baseball team.

References

External links

1971 births
Living people
People from Stuart, Virginia
Atlanta Braves players
Pittsburgh Pirates players
Los Angeles Dodgers players
New York Mets players
Major League Baseball pitchers
Baseball players from Atlanta
Baseball players from Virginia
Virginia Tech Hokies baseball players
Wareham Gatemen players
Macon Braves players
Durham Bulls players
Greenville Braves players
Richmond Braves players
Norfolk Tides players
Albuquerque Dukes players
Nashville Sounds players
Altoona Curve players
Myrtle Beach Pelicans players
Colorado Springs Sky Sox players
Oklahoma RedHawks players
Albuquerque Isotopes players
Somerset Patriots players